George Mickelson could refer to:

George Theodore Mickelson (1903-1965), American judge and 18th governor of South Dakota
George S. Mickelson (1941-1993), 28th governor of South Dakota and son of George Theodore Mickelson